The 2018 Central Arkansas Bears football team represented the University of Central Arkansas in the 2018 NCAA Division I FCS football season. The Bears were led by first-year head coach Nathan Brown and played their home games at Estes Stadium. They were a member of the Southland Conference. They finished the season 6–5, 5–4 in Southland play to finish in a four-way tie for fourth place.

Previous season
The Bears finished the 2017 season 10–2, 9–0 in Southland play to be crowned Southland Conference champions. They received the Southland's automatic bid to the FCS Playoffs where they lost to New Hampshire in the second round.

On December 7, head coach Steve Campbell resigned to become the head coach at South Alabama. He finished at Central Arkansas with a four-year record of 33–15.

Preseason

Preseason All-Conference Teams
On July 12, 2018, the Southland announced their Preseason All-Conference Teams, with the Bears having 11 players selected.

Offense First Team
 Carlos Blackman – Jr. RB

Defense First Team
 Chris Terrell – Jr. DL
 Eric Jackson – Sr. DL
 Juan Jackson – Jr. DB

Offense Second Team
 Josh Nix – So. TE
 Adrian Harris – So. OL
 Hunter Watts – Jr. OL

Defense Second Team
 Cardell Best – Sr. DL
 Nathan Grant – So. DL
 Raphael Garner – Sr. LB
 Cedric Battle – Sr. KR

Preseason Poll
On July 19, 2018, the Southland announced their preseason poll, with the Bears predicted to finish in third place.

Award watch lists

Schedule
Source:  

 *-Indicates Game Broadcast via Tape Delay

Game summaries

at Tulsa

Murray State

Sources:

at Southeastern Louisiana

Sources:

at Sam Houston State

Sources:

Houston Baptist

Sources:

at Stephen F. Austin

Sources:

Northwestern State

Sources:

at McNeese State

Sources:

Lamar

Sources:

Incarnate Word

Sources:

at Abilene Christian

Sources:

Ranking movements

References

Central Arkansas
Central Arkansas Bears football seasons
Central Arkansas Bears football